Manuel López Llamosas (1 May 1900 – 14 October 1975), known as Travieso, was a Spanish footballer who represented multiple teams in Spain. He was capped once by the Spain national football team in 1922, scoring twice.

Club career
Travieso started his career in the academies of Real Zaragoza and CE Sabadell, before going on to play regional football. Travieso's career highlight was his three-year spell at Athletic Bilbao (1921 to 1924), scoring 24 goals in just 22 appearances for the club, including the only goal of the 1923 Copa del Rey Final against Europa.

International career
He earned only one cap for Spain, but he made it count as he scored two goals in a 4-0 win over France on 30 April 1922.

While he was an Athletic Bilbao player, he played for the Biscay national team, being part of the team that participated in two tournaments of the Prince of Asturias Cup in the early 20s, scoring once in the 1922-23 edition and scoring twice in 1923-24 as Biscay beat Asturias 4-2, thus reaching the semi-finals where they were eliminated by Catalonia 0-1 due to a goal from Cristóbal Martí.

Career statistics

Club

Notes

International

International goals
Scores and results list Spain's goal tally first, score column indicates score after each Spain goal.

References

1900 births
1975 deaths
Footballers from Barakaldo
Spanish footballers
Spanish football managers
Spain international footballers
Association football forwards
Segunda División players
Real Zaragoza players
CE Sabadell FC footballers
Barakaldo CF footballers
Arenas Club de Getxo footballers
Athletic Bilbao footballers
Albacete Balompié players
Cartagena FC players
CD Málaga footballers
Sporting de Gijón players
RCD Córdoba footballers
Barakaldo CF managers
CD Málaga managers
Real Jaén managers
CE Constància managers
Racing de Santander managers
Real Murcia managers
Club Puebla managers
Spanish expatriate football managers
Spanish expatriate sportspeople in Mexico
Expatriate football managers in Mexico